The NS 1300 was a series of steam locomotives of Nederlandse Spoorwegen and its predecessors Maatschappij tot Exploitatie van Staatsspoorwegen (SS) and Noord-Brabantsch-Duitsche Spoorweg-Maatschappij (NBDS).

SS 301-475 
This series followed the 101–105 series. After the introduction of the Westinghouse brake, a system whereby the driver could brake all wagons simultaneously, the speed on the railway network could be increased and the SS decided not to expand the series 101–105, but to purchase new, stronger locomotives.

Between 1880 and 1895, 175 locomotives were built by the Beyer, Peacock and Company of Manchester, England. Because these were the largest 1B locomotives in Europe at the time of purchase and with the light green colour scheme of the SS, these locomotives were nicknamed Grote Groenen (Big Greens).

The tenders of the 301-398 had a water capacity of 10.3 m3. From No. 399 onwards, the water capacity of the tenders was increased to 13 m3 by lowering the tank between the frames. Later on, the water capacity of the tenders was also increased in the same way for the 301–398.

When the fleet of the HSM and the SS was merged into the Dutch Railways in 1921, these locomotives were given the NS numbers 1301–1475, with the NS numbers of 1462–1466 in deviation from the SS numbers 463-466 and 462.

The series was withdrawn from service between 1925 and 1940, with the most going in 1935.

The NS 1326, withdrawn in 1939, was kept for the Spoorwegmuseum and has been returned to its Staatsspoorwegen condition as SS 326.

NBDS No. 6, 7, 11 
The mail trains, which had been led via Venlo since 1888, returned in December 1892 to the Boxtel - Wesel, the "German Line". For this, the NBDS ordered three 1'B express locomotives from Beyer, Peacock & Company of Manchester. Unlike No. 8-10, these locomotives were completely similar to the Grote Groenen 301-375 of the SS. In order to be able to deliver of a new locomotive on time despite the delivery deadline, they took the already under construction SS 462 and completed the locomotive for the NBDS and entered service as NBDS 7 in November 1892. A new locomotive, SS 462 was built for the SS.

After the NBDS merged into the SS in 1919, these locomotives were included as SS 476–478 in the fleet of the SS, and two years later, when the fleet of the HSM and the SS was merged into Nederlandse Spoorwegen, they received the NS numbers 1476- 1478. In 1933 No. 1477 was withdrawn. No. 1476 and 1478 followed in 1936.

SS 701 
In 1892, Beyer-Peacock built a compound locomotive which was given the number 701 by the SS. With the series 701-706 entering service in 1910, this locomotive was renumbered to No. 479 in 1909. In 1921, this locomotive was given the NS number 1479.

Because the compound system with this locomotive did not yield any savings, the NS rebuild the locomotive in 1924 into a single expansion. In 1936, the locomotive was withdrawn.

Overview

Gallery

Sources and references 

 R.C. Statius Muller, A.J. Veenendaal jr., H. Waldorp: De Nederlandse stoomlocomotieven. Uitg. De Alk, Alkmaar, 2005. .
 V. Freriks, Schlieper: De Noord-Brabantsch-Duitsche Spoorweg-Maatschappij, de Vlissinger Postroute. Uitg. Uquilair, 2008. .

Rolling stock of the Netherlands
Beyer, Peacock locomotives
Steam locomotives of the Netherlands
Maatschappij tot Exploitatie van Staatsspoorwegen